The Wahgunyah railway is a closed railway line in the north-east of Victoria, Australia. Branching off the main North East railway at Springhurst, it ran north to Wahgunyah. The terminus was near the New South Wales Culcairn - Corowa railway, but no bridge was ever provided over the Murray River. As the two lines were of differing gauges and the stations 2.5 kilometres (1.25 miles) apart there was probably no particular benefit for the expense of building a bridge to connect the two differing systems.

History

The line was opened as a whole from Springhurst to Wahgunyah in 1879. The passenger service was withdrawn on 13 April 1962, being the last mixed train service to operate in Victoria.

Services were suspended in 1995, and the line effectively closed. However the 'Green TRail Associates Group' operated a trolley service over the line between Wahgunyah and Rutherglen for a number of years, known as the 'Stringybark Express - Lil Red Postal Motor'. In 2002 the line was handed back to the Victorian Government by lease holder Freight Australia, and in 2006 it was announced that the Murray to the Mountains Rail Trail would be built along the closed line, with 9 kilometres of trail. This was completed in 2009.

Stations
 Wahgunyah Railway Station, 29 January 1879 – 1 July 1995
 Lilliput Railway Station
 Rutherglen Railway Station, 29 January 1879 – 1 July 1995
 Springhurst Railway Station, 21 November 1873 – present

Today

In its present form, the railway line is partially ripped up due to the Murray to the Mountains Rail Trail along this line. Although being closed for over twenty years now, remnants of the once active rail line such as signs, track and sleepers are visible.

References

External links
 Victorian Railway Stations: Wahgunyah Line

Closed regional railway lines in Victoria (Australia)
Railway lines opened in 1879